Brylov Serhii Volodymyrovych (born April 5, 1974, in Kyiv, Ukraine) is a Ukrainian sculptor.

Biography

Education 
 1986-1992 Taras Shevchenko Republican Art School
 1992-1998 National Academy of Fine Arts and Architecture B.A. Sculpture
 1998-2001 National Academy of Fine Arts and Architecture M.A. Sculpture
 1995 Member of Kyiv Organization Youth Assotiation of the National Union of Artists of Ukraine
 2000 Member of the National Union of Artists of Ukraine

Exhibitions 
 1993-2021 All-Ukrainian Exhibitions, Central House of Artists, Kiev
 1993 Ukrainian Academy of Arts 75th Anniversary Art Exhibition, the Ukrainian House, Kyiv
 1996 Christmas exhibition, Artist Gallery, Kyiv
 1996 The Art of Youth, 36 Gallery, Kyiv
 1996 The Art of Youth, Gallery of the Crimean Organization of the National Union of Artists of Ukraine, Yalta
 1997 Harmony, 36 Gallery, Kyiv
 1997 Youth Chooses Art, Artist Gallery, Kyiv
 1997 L, K, B Solo Exhibition, Museum of Kyiv History, Kyiv
 1998 Boys and Girls, Artist Gallery, Kyiv
 1998 Enclosed in a Circle,Slavutych Gallery, Kyiv
 1999 Ukrainian Sculpture Triennial, Central House of Artists, Kyiv
 2000 3+2,Artist Gallery, Kyiv
 2000 PRO ART Festival, the Ukrainian House, Kyiv
 2002 Ukrainian Sculpture Triennial, Central House of Artists, Kyiv
 2003 Solo Exhibition, Artist Gallery, Kyiv
 2003 New Generation, Central House of Artists, Moscow
 2005 Ukrainian Sculpture Triennial, Central House of Artists, Kyiv
 2008 Ukrainian Sculpture Triennial, Central House of Artists, Kyiv
 2011 Animalistic, Artist Gallery, Kyiv
 2012-2013 The Art of Nations - II. The Exhibition of Commonwealth
 2014 Independent States Artists, Central House of Artists, Moscow
 2014 Solo Exhibition, Artist Gallery, Kyiv
 2016 Color palette, Gallery Mitseva, Kiev
 2016 POWER / Violence /Ruler, Hotel Adlon Berlin Germany
 2020 Ukrainian Sculpture Triennial, Central House of Artists, Kyiv
 Altogether 4 Solo and 40 Group Exhibitions

Collections 
Private collections in the United States, Denmark, South Korea, Germany, Austria, Canada, Switzerland, Russia
Valentina Tereshkova collection
Museum of Kyiv History (Kyiv) Regional Natural History Museum
(Vyshhorod)

Work 
 2011-2017 Kyiv State Mykhailo Boychuk Institute of decorative arts and design, Drawing Department, lecturer
 2017-2019 Senior Lecturer at the Kyiv National University of Technology and Design, Department of Drawing and Painting                                                                                                                 * 2009- 2012 Head of Kyiv Organization Youth Assotiation of the National Union of Artists of Ukraine
 2010-2013 Deputy Head of Kyiv Organization of the National Union of Artists of Ukraine
 2021-2022 Deputy Head of the National Union of Artists of Ukraine

Honors 
 2002 Certificate of Commendation of Chief Department for Arts and Culture of Kiev City State Administration
 2003 Certificate of Commendation of Minister of Culture of Ukraine for personal contribution to the Development of Ukrainian Art
 2011 Certificate for Assistance in charity event "I'll live", All-Ukrainian non-governmental organization "Association for Support of Disabled People and patients with CLL"
 2012 Certificate for highly appreciated social work on raising educational background of Adults of Ukraine and the development of spiritual and intellectual potential of Ukrainian Society and the Ukrainian State.
National Academy of Pedagogical Sciences of Ukraine, All-Ukrainian Bureau "Education of Adults of Ukraine", The UNESCO International Institute for Lifelong Learning                                                                      * 2017 Diploma of the National Union of Artists of Ukraine for a significant personal contribution to the development of Ukrainian fine arts, high professionalism, multi-year creative and pedagogical activity. * 2019- Acknowledgment "For high-quality fruitful activity and asceticism in the field of culture and art. III International Multi-genre Festival of Arts" Magical Melodies ", personal contribution to the development of the world festival movement in Ukraine, active and professional work in the jury of the international festival.
 2019- Acknowledgment "For professional self-explanatory work as part of the commission (jury) of the All-Ukrainian project" JUST FALSE "in 2019."                                                                                             * 2020 - Honorary award of the National Academy of Fine Arts and Architecture
 2020 - Diploma for the active community position for the expansion in the Ukrainian suspension of the sea idea and the renewal of Ukraine in the status of the sea power and for the fate of the project "Expedition 2020", the contest for a child child about the sea "Sea"

References

External links
 Sculptures Website Serhii Brylov
 Брильов Сергій Володимирович
  http://vikna.stb.ua/news/2012/1/11/89009/
  https://web.archive.org/web/20120730115859/http://kpravda.com/v-kieve-paralizovano-bolshinstvo-masterskix-xudozhnikov-i-skulptorov-nechem-platit-za-teplo/
  https://web.archive.org/web/20090831070428/http://www.ukraine.org/VKyiv/vk1/s3.htm
  https://www.umoloda.kyiv.ua/number/2038/189/72597/
  https://scholar.google.com.ua/citations?user=W3vld00AAAAJ&hl=uk
  https://web.archive.org/web/20160303212840/http://www.lympho.com.ua/news/zelena-khvylya
  http://konshu.org/section/sculpture/briloyv-sergey.html
  http://esu.com.ua/search_articles.php?id=37776

Ukrainian sculptors
Ukrainian male sculptors
1974 births
Living people